These quarterbacks have started at least one game for the Tennessee Titans of the National Football League. They are listed in order of the date of each player's first start at quarterback for the Titans.

Starting quarterbacks

The number of games they started during the season is listed to the right:

Regular season

Postseason

Most games as starting quarterback
These quarterbacks have at least 40 starts for the Oilers/Titans in regular season games.

Team career passing records
These quarterbacks have over 10,000 career passing yards with the Oilers/Titans.

See also
 Lists of NFL starting quarterbacks

References
 Tennessee Titans Franchise Encyclopedia

Tennessee Titans

quarterbacks